Khasan Sharpudiyevich Dzhunidov (born 15 March 1991) is a former Russian footballer.

Career
Dzhunidov made his professional debut for FC Terek Grozny on 13 July 2010 in the Russian Cup game against FC Luch-Energiya Vladivostok.

External links
  Player page on the official FC Terek Grozny website
 

1991 births
Living people
Russian footballers
Association football defenders
FC Akhmat Grozny players
FC Rotor Volgograd players
FC Mashuk-KMV Pyatigorsk players